Donald Murdoch (27 March 1923 – 28 February 2014) was a New Zealand cricketer. He played three first-class matches for Otago between 1943 and 1945.

See also
 List of Otago representative cricketers

References

External links
 

1923 births
2014 deaths
New Zealand cricketers
Otago cricketers
People from Lawrence, New Zealand